Shah Farman is a Pakistani politician from Pakistan Tehreek-e-Insaf. He served as the 32nd Governor of Khyber Pakhtunkhwa from 5 September 2018 to 16 April 2022. Previously, he was a member of the Khyber Pakhtunkhwa Assembly from May 2013 to May 2018, and again from August 2018 to September 2018.

Political career
Farman is associated with Pakistan Tehreek-e-Insaf (PTI) at least since 1998.

He had been Member of the Khyber Pakhtunkhwa Assembly between 2013 and 2018. He also served as the minister for public health engineering and information in Pervez Khattak cabinet. He was re-elected to the KPK Assembly as a candidate of PTI from Constituency PK-71 Peshawar-VI in 2018 Pakistani general election. He received 17,309 votes and defeated Sifat Ullah, a candidate of Pakistan Muslim League (N).

On 16 August 2018, he was nominated for the post of Governor of Khyber Pakhtunkhwa. On 4 September 2018, he resigned from his Khyber Pakhtunkhwa Assembly seat after casting his vote in the 2018 Pakistani presidential election. On 5 September 2018, Farman took oath as Governor of Khyber Pakthunkhwa. On 16 April 2022, his resignation as Khyber Pakhtunkhwa Governor was accepted by President Arif Alvi.

References

Living people
Khyber Pakhtunkhwa MPAs 2013–2018
Pakistan Tehreek-e-Insaf MPAs (Khyber Pakhtunkhwa)
Governors of Khyber Pakhtunkhwa
Year of birth missing (living people)